Egypt III, known as The Egyptian Prophecy in North America, is a 2004 graphic adventure game developed by Kheops Studio and published by The Adventure Company. The player must solve an array of ancient riddles that will help a dying Pharaoh survive and restore Egypt to glory. The game is the third and final game in the Egypt trilogy, following Egypt 1156 B.C. and Egypt II: The Heliopolis Prophecy. In 2010, Microïds released an adaptation of the game, split into parts, for the Apple iPhone.

Gameplay

Plot
At the age of sixty years, Pharaoh Ramesses II asks the Oracle of Ammun to extend his reign; the God accepts, at the condition that a majestic obelisk is built before the Shemu season comes. But despite initial progress, the construction suddenly stops and Pharaoh sends one of his priestess, Maya, to investigate.

Development
Following the 2002 bankruptcy and liquidation of Cryo Interactive, many of its key assets were purchased by DreamCatcher Interactive to form that company's new European branch. Two development teams, including the one behind Cryo's Egypt series, were among these acquisitions. DreamCatcher subsequently revealed Egypt III in April 2003, under the name The Egyptian Prophecy in North America and Egypt III: The Fate of Ramses in Europe. It was among a slew of announcements by the company in preparation for the 2003 Electronic Entertainment Expo (E3). Initially, Egypt III was developed internally by DreamCatcher Europe. However, in the summer, DreamCatcher Europe shuttered the game development divisions it had carried over from Cryo. Adventure Gamers later noted that Egypt III "seemed destined for cancellation".

A group of those laid off from DreamCatcher Europe, led by Benoît Hozjan, proceeded to found the independent developer Kheops Studio. According to Hozjan, most of the team had already been involved in Egypt III before its development was interrupted, and Kheops received a contract from DreamCatcher to complete the game. Jeux Video noted that Egypt III had "quietly resumed development" and was nearing completion by January 2004.

As Cryo had done for Egypt II, Kheops worked with archeologist Jean-Claude Golvin to increase historical accuracy. Unlike its predecessors, it was not created in collaboration with the Réunion des Musées Nationaux. Egypt III was targeted primarily at casual gamers.

Reception 
Andrew Plotkin of Zarf thought the game contained a thin story backed by copious amounts of educational historical information.  Slydos of Adventure-Archiv thought it was entertaining, though not innovative. GameBoomers praised it for not being too long or difficult, mainstays of the genre. Tap-Repeatedly reviewer Toger deemed the game a "nice little diversion". WorthPlaying recommended the game to Myst fans. Steve Ramsey of Quandary noted that the player doesn't need to have played the game's predecessors in order to understand the plot. Dan Ravipinto of Adventure Gamers criticised the game's cluttered environments and slow interface. Jeux Video thought the short and easy game would offer a pleasant Egyptian adventure for the player.  Game Chronicles thought the game would only receive acclaim or interest from fans of the adventure game genre.

References

External links
Egypt 3: The Egyptian Prophecy at Microïds

2004 video games
Adventure games
Microïds games
Video games featuring female protagonists
Video games developed in France
Video games set in Egypt
Windows-only games
Windows games
Kheops Studio games
Egypt (video game series)
Video games based on Egyptian mythology
Point-and-click adventure games